Grønfjorden (English: Green Fjord or Green Harbour) is a 16 km long fjord, separated from Isfjorden to the north by Festningsodden in the west and Heerodden in the east. It lies within the western portion of Nordenskiöld Land. On its eastern shore is the mining community of Barentsburg, the second largest settlement (after Longyearbyen) on Spitsbergen.

History

The fjord was named Green Harbour by the English explorer (and later whaler) Jonas Poole in 1610. Grønfjorden is the Norwegian equivalent. The first whaleship (a Basque vessel) reached Grønfjorden in 1612; it continued to be used for whaling up until the 1650s.

Grønfjorden was the site of the air attack in 1942 during the Operation Fritham.

See also
History of Basque whaling

References 

 Conway, W. M. 1906. No Man's Land: A History of Spitsbergen from Its Discovery in 1596 to the Beginning of the Scientific Exploration of the Country. Cambridge: At the University Press.
 Norwegian Polar Institute Place Names of Svalbard Database

Fjords of Spitsbergen